OP8 is the musical collaboration of the multi-instrumentalist Lisa Germano, Howe Gelb, Joey Burns and John Convertino. Joey Burns and John Convertino form the band Calexico together and have both been members of Gelb's Giant Sand.

The only album to be recorded by OP8 was Slush. It was not a commercial success, but critics acclaimed its experimental flourishes and solid songwriting.

Lineup
Lisa Germano: violin, piano, mandolin, vocals
Howe Gelb: guitar, piano, vocals
Joey Burns: bass, cello, guitar, vocals
John Convertino: drums

Discography
Slush (1997 Thirsty Ear)

External links
Information on Slush
Lisa Germano's official site

1997 debut albums
American multi-instrumentalists
American musical groups
Thirsty Ear Recordings artists